Egon Monk (18 May 1927 – 28 February 2007) was a German actor, director and author.

Biography
Monk was born in Berlin, Germany and grew up in Berlin-Wedding. He served in the German Air Force in World War II (1943–1945). After the war he became an actor. Later he worked for RIAS Berlin (1954–1959) and for the NDR. He died in Hamburg, Germany.

In 2019, a two-part German-Austrian-Czech fictional film was produced as a biopic and docudrama for television from 2019. It deals with the life and work of the playwright and poet Bertolt Brecht and features 'Egon Monk' portrayed by Franz Dinda. The film was shot based on the script by Heinrich Breloer and directed by him. The premiere took place at the 2019 Berlinale.

Awards and honors
Monk won three Teleplay Awards at the Baden-Baden TV Film Festival (1966, 1973, 1989) and one German Critics Association Award (1988).

Filmography

Television director
 Die Gewehre der Frau Carrar (1953) — (based on Señora Carrar's Rifles)
 Das Geld, das auf der Straße liegt (1958) — (based on a play by )
 Die Brüder (1958) — (based on Pierre et Jean)
  (1962) — (based on Life of Galileo)
 Anfrage (1962) — (based on a novel by )
 Schlachtvieh (1963) — (screenplay by )
 Wassa Schelesnowa (1963) — (based on Vassa Zheleznova)
 Mauern (1963) — (screenplay by )
 Wilhelmsburger Freitag (1964) — (screenplay by )
  (1965) — (based on a memoir by )
 The Moment of Peace (1965, TV anthology film, co-directors: Georges Franju, Tadeusz Konwicki)
 Preis der Freiheit (1966) — (screenplay by )
 Über den Gehorsam. Szenen aus Deutschland, wo die Unterwerfung des eigenen Willens unter einen fremden als Tugend gilt (1968)
 Goldene Städte (1969) — (based on Their Very Own and Golden City by Arnold Wesker)
 Die Räuber (1969) — (based on The Robbers)
 Industrielandschaft mit Einzelhändlern (1970)
  (1973, TV miniseries) — (based on a novel by Hans Fallada)
 Die Gewehre der Frau Carrar (1975) — (based on Señora Carrar's Rifles)
  (1983, TV film) — (based on a novel by Lion Feuchtwanger)
 Die Bertinis (1988, TV miniseries) — (based on a novel by Ralph Giordano)

References

External links

German male television actors
German television directors

1927 births
2007 deaths
Luftwaffe personnel of World War II
German male writers